Neyduleh or Ney Duleh may refer to:
 Neyduleh-ye Olya
 Neyduleh-ye Sofla